The men's épée was one of eight fencing events on the fencing at the 1964 Summer Olympics programme. It was the fourteenth appearance of the event. The competition was held from October 18 to 19 1964. 65 fencers from 25 nations competed. Each nation was limited to three fencers. The event was won by Grigory Kriss of the Soviet Union, the nation's first gold medal in the event after a bronze four years earlier. The Soviets also took bronze, with Guram Kostava finishing in third place. Between the two was silver medalist Bill Hoskyns of Great Britain; it was the second consecutive Games with a British silver medalist in the event. Italy's six-Games gold medal streak in the men's individual épée ended with the nation missing the podium entirely; Gianluigi Saccaro finished fourth after losing the bronze-medal barrage to Kostava.

Background

This was the 14th appearance of the event, which was not held at the first Games in 1896 (with only foil and sabre events held) but has been held at every Summer Olympics since 1900.

Four of the eight finalists from the 1960 Games returned, including all three medalists: gold medalist (and 1956 silver medalist) Giuseppe Delfino of Italy, silver medalist Allan Jay of Great Britain, bronze medalist Bruno Habārovs of the Soviet Union, and sixth-place finisher Yves Dreyfus of France. The field included the previous five World Champions: Bill Hoskyns of Great Britain (1958), Habārovs (1959), Jack Guittet of France (1961), István Kausz of Hungary (1962), and Roland Losert of Austria (1963, the reigning champion).

Malaysia and South Korea each made their debut in the event. Belgium and the United States each appeared for the 13th time, tied for most among nations.

Competition format

The competition underwent a significant format change from prior Games. Rather than exclusively pool play, the format now featured a mix of pool play and single-elimination brackets. It was the first time, other than the odd "extra final" round in 1928, that bracket play was used in the event. The format began with two rounds of pool play that narrowed the field to 24 fencers, continued with three rounds of knockout brackets that reduced the competitors to 4, and finished with a final pool featuring those fencers. A ranking bracket was also used for the four quarterfinal losers, placing them 5th, 6th, and 7th (two fencers, with no 7th/8th match). Barrages were used to break ties where necessary for advancement out of pools. Pool round bouts were to 5 touches, with double-losses possible. Knockout round bouts were to 10 touches.

 Round 1: 8 pools, 8 or 9 fencers to a pool, top 5 advance (total 40 advancing)
 Round 2: 6 pools, 6 or 7 fencers to a pool, top 4 advance (total 24 advancing)
 Round of 24: Single-elimination. 16 of the 24 fencers competed, with 8 others having a bye.
 Round of 16: Single-elimination. The 8 winners of the round of 24 faced the 8 fencers who had a bye.
 Quarterfinals: Single-elimination, with losers to a consolation bracket. The winners advanced to the final pool.
 5th–8th bracket: Quarterfinal losers competed in two 5th–8th semifinals, with the winners playing a 5th/6th final.
 Final pool: The four quarterfinal winners competed in a round-robin final pool.

Schedule

All times are Japan Standard Time (UTC+9)

Results

Round 1

Round 1 pool A

Round 1 pool B

 Barrage

Round 1 pool C

 Barrage

Round 1 pool D

Round 1 pool E

Round 1 pool F

 Barrage

Round 1 pool G

Round 1 pool H

Round 2

Round 2 pool A

Round 2 pool B

 Barrage

Round 2 pool C

Round 2 pool D

Round 2 pool E

Round 2 pool F

 Barrage

Knockout rounds

The winner of each group advanced to the final pool, while the runner-up moved into a 5th-place semifinal.

Group 1

Group 2

Group 3

Group 4

Fifth place semifinal

Final

 Gold medal barrage

 Bronze medal barrage

References

Sources
 

Fencing at the 1964 Summer Olympics
Men's events at the 1964 Summer Olympics